This is the list of cathedrals in Rwanda sorted by denomination.

Roman Catholic 

Cathedrals of the Roman Catholic Church in Rwanda:
Cathedral of Butare
Cathedral of Byumba
Cathedral of Christ the King in Cyangugu
Cathedral of Gikongoro
Cathedral Basilica of Our Lady in Kabgayi
Cathedral of St. Peter in Kibungo
Cathedral of St. Michael in Kigali
Cathedral of Nyundo
Cathedral of Ruhengeri

Anglican
Cathedrals of the Anglican Church of Rwanda:
Christ the King cathedral in Cyangugu
St Etienne Cathedral, Kigali
St Paul Cathedral, Butare
St John The Baptist Cathedral, Shyira
St peter Cathedral, Shyogwe
St John Cathedral, Gahini
Kibungo Cathedral, Ngoma
Kivu Cathedral, Rubavu
St Paul Cathedral, Byumba
Kigeme Cathedral, Nyamagabe
Holy trinity Cathedral, Gasabo
Karongi cathedral, Karongi

See also
List of cathedrals

References

Churches in Rwanda
Rwanda
Cathedral
Cathedrals